Zamek (the Polish word for "castle") may refer to:
Zamek, popular name for the palace called the Imperial Castle in Poznań
Zamek, Pomeranian Voivodeship, a village in northern Poland

See also